USS Franklin may refer to:

 , a 6-gun schooner, fitted out in 1775 and returned to the owner in 1776
 , an 8-gun brig built in 1795, captured by corsairs from Tripoli in 1802, bought back by the United States Navy in 1805, and sold in 1807
 , a 74-gun ship of the line launched in 1815 and broken up in 1852
 , a screw frigate launched in 1864 and in active service until 1877, thereafter used as a receiving ship until 1915
 , an aircraft carrier commissioned in 1944 and crippled by bombs in March 1945, later repaired but remaining in reserve until stricken in 1964

See also
 , a ballistic missile submarine
 USS Bonhomme Richard
 , an aircraft carrier

United States Navy ship names